The 2004 World U-17 Hockey Challenge was an international ice hockey tournament held in Newfoundland, Canada between . The two main venues were the Mile One Stadium in St. John's and the Glacier Arena in Mount Pearl, while the S. W. Moores Arena in Harbour Grace and the Whitbourne Arena were also used for exhibition games.

Ten teams participated, including the United States, Russia, Slovakia, Germany, Finland and five regional teams representing Canada – Canada Pacific, Canada West, Canada Quebec, Canada Ontario and Canada Atlantic.  Team Ontario defeated Team Pacific 5–2 to win the gold medal, while Team Quebec defeated the United States 3–2 to capture the bronze, marking the first time in the tournament's history that Canada swept all three medals.

Challenge results

References
2004 World U-17 Hockey Challenge at HockeyCanada.ca (Archived 2009-08-14)

See also
2004 Ivan Hlinka Memorial Tournament
2004 IIHF World U18 Championships
2004 World Junior Championships

U-17
U-17
U-17
U-17
U-17
U-17
World U-17 Hockey Challenge
Ice hockey in Newfoundland and Labrador
International ice hockey competitions hosted by Canada
2003 in Newfoundland and Labrador
2004 in Newfoundland and Labrador